Calvin Dekuyper (born 24 February 2000) is a Belgian professional footballer who plays as a midfielder.

Career
Dekuyper made his Belgian First Division A debut for Cercle Brugge on 26 October 2019 in a game against Genk. On 11 August 2021, he joined Mouscron for one season with an option for a second.

References

External links
 

2000 births
Sportspeople from Ostend
Footballers from West Flanders
Living people
Belgian footballers
Association football midfielders
Cercle Brugge K.S.V. players
Royal Excel Mouscron players
Belgian Pro League players
Challenger Pro League players